Football is one of the most popular sports in Barbados.

History

The Barbados Football Association

The Barbados Football Association (BFA) is the governing body of football in Barbados. It was established in 1910.

League system

Barbadian football clubs

National teams

Barbados has had limited success a national  team.

A Barbados women's national football team, Barbados men's national under-17 football team, Barbados men's national under-15 football team, Barbados women's national under-17 and women's under-15 team also compete.

See also
Barbados men's national football team
Barbados men's national under-17 football team
Barbados women's national football team
Barbados Football Association
Barbados Premier League 
Sport in Barbados

References

External links
Barbados Football Association
 Barbados at the FIFA website